Macedonia (officially under the provisional appellation "former Yugoslav Republic of Macedonia", abbreviated "FYR Macedonia") participated in the Eurovision Song Contest 2008 with the song "Let Me Love You" written by Rade Vrčakovski. The song was performed by Tamara, Vrčak and Adrian. The Macedonian broadcaster Macedonian Radio Television (MRT) organised Skopje Fest 2008 in order to select the Macedonian entry for the 2008 contest in Belgrade, Serbia. Fifteen entries competed in the competition on 23 February 2008 where "Vo ime na ljubovta" performed by Tamara, Vrčak and Adrian was selected following the combination of votes from a five-member jury panel and a public televote. The song was later translated from Macedonian to English for the Eurovision Song Contest and was titled "Let Me Love You".

Macedonia was drawn to compete in the second semi-final of the Eurovision Song Contest which took place on 22 May 2008. Performing during the show in position 18, "Let Me Love You" was not announced among the 10 qualifying entries of the second semi-final and therefore did not qualify to compete in the final. This marked the first time that Macedonia failed to qualify to the final of the Eurovision Song Contest from a semi-final since the introduction of semi-finals in 2004. It was later revealed that Macedonia placed tenth out of the 19 participating countries in the semi-final with 64 points.

Background

The nation's best result in the contest to this point was twelfth, which it achieved in 2006 with the song "Ninanajna" performed by Elena Risteska.

The Macedonian national broadcaster, Macedonian Radio Television (MRT), broadcasts the event within Macedonia and organises the selection process for the nation's entry. Macedonia had previously selected their entry for the Eurovision Song Contest through both national finals and internal selections. MRT confirmed their intentions to participate at the 2008 Eurovision Song Contest on 28 November 2007. Since 1996, Macedonia selected their entries using a national final. For 2008, the broadcaster returned to using the music festival Skopje Fest as a national final to select the Macedonian entry.

Before Eurovision

Skopje Fest 2008 
Skopje Fest 2008 was a song contest organised by MRT that served as Macedonia's national final to select their entry for the Eurovision Song Contest 2008. Fifteen entries participated in the competition which took place on 23 February 2008 at the Metropolis Arena in Skopje, hosted by Živkica Gjurčinovska and Borislav Tnokovski and was broadcast on MTV 1 and MTV Sat.

Competing entries 
A submission period was opened for interested artists and composers to submit their songs between 30 November 2007 and 31 December 2007. MRT received 130 submissions at the closing of the deadline. Fifteen entries were selected from the open submissions, while an additional six entries were submitted by well-known composers directly invited by MRT for the competition. The twenty-one competing artists and songs were announced on 12 January 2008 during a press conference at the M-1 Studio in Skopje. 

On 14 January 2008, MRT announced that all six entries written by invited composers: "Apolon" performed by Maja Vukićević, "Kubana" performed by Agon and Džoksi, "Životot e tvoj" performed by Sanja Lefkova, "Slatka mala" performed by Igor Šarevski, "Eden čekor ili dva" performed by Filip Jordanovski and "Holivud" performed by Bojan and Big Mama were withdrawn from the competition due to negative reactions from composers of the entries selected from the open submissions.

Final 
The final took place on 23 February 2008. Fifteen entries competed and a 50/50 combination of public televoting and a five-member jury panel selected "Vo ime na ljubovta" performed by Tamara, Vrčak and Adrian as the winner. The jury panel consisted of Kire Kostov (composer and conductor), Sanja Šuplevska-Boiral (violinist), Vesna Maljanovska (musicologist and music journalist), Anita Latifi (journalist) and Lidija Kočovska (singer). In addition to the performances of the competing entries, the competition featured guest performances by Makmodels, Silvi Bend, 2008 Belarusian Eurovision representative Ruslan Alekhno and 2006 Bosnian Eurovision representative Hari Mata Hari. The show also featured a tribute to 2004 Macedonian Eurovision representative Toše Proeski who died in 2007.

Preparation 
It was revealed in late March that "Vo ime na ljubovta" would be performed in English at the Eurovision Song Contest as "Let Me Love You". Vrčak worked with Macedonian producers Valentino Skenderovski and Robert Bilbilov to create the final version of the song in the Netherlands, which was released on 7 April along with its Turkish, Albanian, Serbian and Russian versions.

Promotion 
Tamara, Vrčak and Adrian made several appearances across Europe to specifically promote "Let Me Love You" as the Macedonian Eurovision entry. On 2 March, Tamara, Vrčak and Adrian performed "Let Me Love You" during the presentation show of the 2008 Bosnian Eurovision entry, BH Eurosong Show 2008. The trio also performed the song during the semi-final of the Serbian Eurovision national final Beovizija 2008 on 9 March.

At Eurovision
It was announced in September 2007 that the competition's format would be expanded to two semi-finals in 2008. According to Eurovision rules, all nations with the exceptions of the host country and the "Big Four" (France, Germany, Spain and the United Kingdom) are required to qualify from one of two semi-finals in order to compete for the final; the top nine songs from each semi-final as determined by televoting progress to the final, and a tenth was determined by back-up juries. The European Broadcasting Union (EBU) split up the competing countries into six different pots based on voting patterns from previous contests, with countries with favourable voting histories put into the same pot. On 28 January 2008, a special allocation draw was held which placed each country into one of the two semi-finals. Bulgaria was placed into the second semi-final, to be held on 22 May 2008. The running order for the semi-finals was decided through another draw on 17 March 2008 and as one of the six wildcard countries, Macedonia chose to perform in position 18, following the entry from Cyprus and before the entry from Portugal.

The two semi-finals and final were broadcast in Macedonia on MTV 1 and MTV Sat with commentary by Milanka Rašić. The Macedonian spokesperson, who announced the Macedonian votes during the final, was Ognen Janeski.

Semi-final 

Tamara, Vrčak and Adrian took part in technical rehearsals on 14 and 17 May, followed by dress rehearsals on 21 and 22 May. The Macedonian performance featured Tamara, Vrčak and Adrian performing together with two dancers and a backing vocalist; Tamara wore a black dress while Vrčak and Adrian were in white outfits. The background LED screens displayed blue and white colours. The two dancers that joined Tamara, Vrčak and Adrian on stage were Aleksa Raifović and Toma Đorđević and the backing vocalist was Nade Talevska.

At the end of the show, Macedonia was not announced among the 10 qualifying entries in the second semi-final and therefore failed to qualify to compete in the final. This marked the first time that Macedonia failed to qualify to the final of the Eurovision Song Contest from a semi-final since the introduction of semi-finals in 2004. It was later revealed that Macedonia placed tenth in the semi-final, receiving a total of 64 points.

Voting 
Below is a breakdown of points awarded to Macedonia and awarded by Macedonia in the first semi-final and grand final of the contest. The nation awarded its 12 points to Albania in the semi-final and the final of the contest.

Points awarded to Macedonia

Points awarded by Macedonia

References

2008
Countries in the Eurovision Song Contest 2008
Eurovision